Jonathan Tanner Miller (born March 14, 1993) is an American professional ice hockey forward and alternate captain for the Vancouver Canucks of the National Hockey League (NHL). He has previously played for the New York Rangers and Tampa Bay Lightning. He was selected by the Rangers in the first round (15th overall) at the 2011 NHL Entry Draft. A versatile forward, Miller can play as a center or winger.

Early life
Miller grew up in a residential area in East Palestine, Ohio, blocks away from the East Palestine City School District campus, attending through grades kindergarten through 10th. He began playing ice hockey at a young age and also participated in other organized athletics, including baseball and football. Miller played for several ice hockey teams from the age of five through 12 before ending up with the Pittsburgh Hornets from age 12 to age 16, as at the time his family was living in the Pittsburgh suburb of Coraopolis. Miller played in the 2006 Quebec International Pee-Wee Hockey Tournament with the Pittsburgh Hornets minor ice hockey team. In 2009, Miller moved to Ann Arbor, Michigan, to participate in USA Hockey's two-year National Team Development Program (U.S. NTDP).

Playing career

Amateur
Miller began 2009–10 with the U.S. NTDP of the United States Hockey League (USHL). After two seasons playing in the program, he was selected in the first round, 15th overall, of the 2011 NHL Entry Draft by the New York Rangers.

For the 2011–12 season, Miller transitioned to major junior ice hockey, joining the Plymouth Whalers of the Ontario Hockey League (OHL). Towards the latter stage of the season, he then joined the Connecticut Whale, the Rangers' American Hockey League (AHL) affiliate, for their run in the 2012 Calder Cup playoffs. He registered one assist in eight playoff games, and after Connecticut was eliminated, Miller was added to the Rangers' Stanley Cup playoff roster.

Professional

New York Rangers
Miller joined the Rangers organization for the 2012–13 season. After beginning the season with the Connecticut Whale of the AHL, Miller was recalled by the Rangers on February 5. On February 7, he recorded his first two career NHL goals, against Evgeni Nabokov of the New York Islanders in a 4–1 win. After the Whale season concluded, Miller was added to the Rangers' 2013 playoff roster, but did not play in a game.

Miller wore #47 during the 2012–13 season, but switched to #10 for the 2013–14 season. Miller split time between the Rangers and the Hartford Wolf Pack during the season. At the end of the Wolf Pack season, Miller was once again added to the Rangers playoff roster, making his Stanley Cup Playoff debut in Game 5 of the Rangers’ first round series against the Philadelphia Flyers, recording an assist on a Brad Richards goal. Ultimately, Miller played in four playoffs games, recording two assists as the Rangers lost to the Los Angeles Kings in the 2014 Stanley Cup Finals.

Miller finally secured a full-time roster spot with the Rangers during the 2014–15 season, scoring 10 goals and 13 assists in 58 games. Miller agreed to a one-year contract extension on July 15.

Miller had a breakout season in 2015–16, scoring 22 goals and 21 assists, at times finding himself on the Rangers top line with Derek Stepan and Mats Zuccarello. After the season, Miller signed a new two-year, $5.5 million contract with New York.

Miller set even higher marks during the 2016–17 season. Despite finishing with the same goal total of 22, he recorded 34 assists for a career-high 56 points.

During the 2018 NHL Winter Classic, Miller scored the overtime-winning goal in a 3–2 win over the Buffalo Sabres at Citi Field in Queens, New York.

Tampa Bay Lightning
On February 26, 2018, Miller was traded (along with Ryan McDonagh) to the Tampa Bay Lightning in exchange for Libor Hájek, Brett Howden, Vladislav Namestnikov, a first-round pick in the 2018 NHL Entry Draft and a conditional second-round pick in the 2019 NHL Entry Draft.

On March 13, 2018, in a 7–4 Lightning loss to the Ottawa Senators, Miller scored his first career NHL hat-trick. On June 26, 2018, Miller signed a five-year, $26.25 million contract with the Lightning.

Vancouver Canucks
On June 22, 2019, on the second day of the 2019 NHL Entry Draft, Miller was traded to the Vancouver Canucks in exchange for Marek Mazanec, a third-round pick in the 2019 Draft and a conditional first-round pick in the 2020 NHL Entry Draft. On October 28, during a 7–2 win over the Florida Panthers, Miller scored his 100th career goal. That season, Miller would achieve the greatest all-around season of his career up until that point. In his first season with the Canucks, Miller would either tie for the lead, or outright lead the team in goals (27), assists (45) and points (72) during the regular season, as well as tie for the playoff points lead (18).

On September 2, 2022, Miller signed a seven-year, $56 million contract extension with the Canucks.

International play

Miller represented the United States junior team at the 2012 World Junior Ice Hockey Championships, where he played in six games, scoring two goals and two assists.

Miller was also selected to represent the United States at the 2013 World Junior Ice Hockey Championships, where he led the team with seven assists and tied for the team lead with nine points, winning a gold medal in the process.

Miller represented Team North America, a team consisting of players age 23 and under, in the 2016 World Cup of Hockey, but only appeared in one game.

Personal life
Miller and his wife Natalie have two daughters; Scotlyn born in 2018, and Scarlett born in 2019 as well as a son, Owen Edward born September 1, 2022.

Career statistics

Regular season and playoffs

International

Awards and honours

References

External links

 

1993 births
Living people
American expatriate ice hockey players in Canada
American men's ice hockey centers
Connecticut Whale (AHL) players
Hartford Wolf Pack players
Ice hockey players from Ohio
Ice hockey players from Pennsylvania
National Hockey League first-round draft picks
New York Rangers draft picks
New York Rangers players
People from East Palestine, Ohio
People from Coraopolis, Pennsylvania
Plymouth Whalers players
Sportspeople from the Pittsburgh metropolitan area
Tampa Bay Lightning players
USA Hockey National Team Development Program players
Vancouver Canucks players